In 2023, the United Kingdom experienced flooding.

January 
On 14 January, the Met Office issued 98 flood warnings and 169 alerts across England. The River Ouse broke its banks, causing severe flooding in York which left parts of the city centre submerged, with rescue workers seen travelling down the street in boats. The River Severn also broke its banks in some areas, causing flooding in Shrewsbury. A mother and her six-month-old baby were saved from a flood near Nynehead, Somerset which left their car stuck. In Devon, the River Exe burst its banks between the villages of Oakfordbridge and Exebridge, which also affected Bickleigh. The Great Western Railway faced delays, with two train lines blocked between Bristol Parkway and Swindon, and the line between Bristol Temple Meads, Bath and Swindon. The line between Totnes and Plymouth was also blocked.

On 16 January, severe flooding affected East Sussex after heavy rain overnight. In Hastings, the Priory Meadow Shopping Centre had to be closed after it was severely flooded, as well as the surrounding area. Many roads around in the town closed, as well as parts of many A roads being closed or affected. Other flooded areas included East Lavant, Ashburnham, Shripney, Sedlescombe, Westham and Alfriston. In Polegate, large pumping trucks were called out to deal with surface water which had formed on roads throughout the town. Seven "take action now" flood warnings were issued in Sussex. In Dorset, an industrial estate in Woolsbridge was flooded, and a road was blocked by floodwater in Burton. On 18 January, a major incident was declared in Somerset by the Environment Agency due to flooding risks. On 24 January, the major incident in Somerset came to an end.

On 19 January, part of the A303 in Wiltshire was closed due to flooding.

References 

2020s floods in the United Kingdom
2023 floods in Europe
Climate change in the United Kingdom
January 2023 events in the United Kingdom